Matilde Díaz Vélez (2 July 1899 – 9 June 1986) was a philanthropist and urbanist whose will started the Fundación Carlos Díaz Vélez, which is concerned with education about cattle farming. The foundation is named for her father. She had significance to Guernica, Buenos Aires.

References 

Argentine philanthropists
Argentine women architects
Architects from Buenos Aires
1899 births
1986 deaths
20th-century philanthropists
Burials at La Recoleta Cemetery